Jim Salicrup (born May 29, 1957) is an American comic book editor, known for his tenures at Marvel Comics and Topps Comics. At Marvel, where he worked for twenty years, he edited books such as The Uncanny X-Men, Fantastic Four, Avengers and various Spider-Man titles. At Topps, he edited books such as Bram Stoker's Dracula, X-Files and Zorro.

He later worked at Stan Lee Media, before becoming editor-in-chief at Papercutz, which publishes Nancy Drew, The Hardy Boys. He is also a trustee at the Museum of Comic and Cartoon Art.

Career
Salicrup began his comics career at Marvel Comics when he was 15, having written to Roy Thomas offering to be "a Marvel slave"; Thomas and Sol Brodsky hired him to be a messenger transporting original art to the offices of the Comics Code Authority for approval. He subsequently worked his way up to editor. A Marvel employee for twenty years, he edited The Avengers, The Uncanny X-Men, and The Fantastic Four. In 1987, Salicrup became the editor of The Amazing Spider-Man and oversaw the "Kraven's Last Hunt" storyline. He is credited with coming up with the idea of running "Kraven's Last Hunt" as a crossover through all the Spider-Man titles. He followed this by hiring Todd McFarlane to draw the title. The popularity of McFarlane's work led to the launch of another Spider-Man title, Spider-Man, which Salicrup edited as well. Salicrup was the editor of Marvel Age magazine for eight years. He wrote licensed Marvel comic adaptations of Transformers, Sledge Hammer!, and The A-Team.  He also wrote the novelty comic book printed on a toilet paper roll for The Amazing Spider-Man and the Incredible Hulk 

In 1992, Salicrup became the editor-in-chief of Topps Comics, where he edited Bram Stoker's Dracula, X-Files, The Lone Ranger and Tonto, Zorro, Lady Rawhide, a line of Jack Kirby superhero titles, Ray Bradbury Comics, and more.

At Stan Lee Media, Salicrup served as senior writer/editor, as well as the writer and voice of "Stan Lee's Evil Clone".

Salicrup is the editor-in-chief at Papercutz, publishers of Nancy Drew, The Hardy Boys, Tales From The Crypt, Totally Spies!, and Zorro graphic novels.

He is a trustee at the Museum of Comic and Cartoon Art (MoCCA).

Appearances in media

The name "Salicrup" was used as a unit of measuring time in DC Comics' R.E.B.E.L.S. issue #8, November 2009.

Personal life
Salicrup lives in Manhattan's East Village, not far from the site of the 2015 East Village gas explosion.

References

External links

Papercutz website
MoCCA Museum of Comic and Cartoon Art

"Where's Jim Salicrup?" Evolved Friends Productions
Ong Pang Kean, Benjamin. "The Hardy Boys and Nancy Drew's Comic Book Adventures" Newsarama; Aug. 25, 2004
"Salicrup Talks Toilet Paper" The Comic Book Literacy Blog; November 19, 2007
"A Conversation with Jim Salicrup" Comic Geek Speak Episode 329; November 20, 2007

1957 births
Living people
Comic book editors
American comics writers
People from the East Village, Manhattan
Marvel Comics people